The EU20 is an East German standard gauge electric locomotive specially built for, and used by, the Polish national rail operator, PKP.

History
In production for a mere three years (1955–1958), the series was built at the Lokomotivbau Elektrotechnische Werke works — commonly shortened to LEW — in Hennigsdorf, East Germany. During this time, 34 units were produced with the intention for use as a mixed-traffic locomotive – hence its EU designation – though the reality is that the EU20 saw more use as a freight locomotive than a passenger one. EU20s were the first electric locomotives to be used on the route between Warsaw and Silesia.

The class gained notoriety for its frequent breakdowns due to overheating of resistors, and the lack of additional cooling facilities found in other locomotives.

Technical data
Mechanically, the EU20 was identical to the earlier EU04 (also built by LEW), sharing the same traction engines, rectifiers, and gas compressors.

Operational history
During the series' 26-year service, most units were assigned to the Piotrków Trybunalski depot. EU20s were withdrawn over a 6-year period, beginning in 1976, with the last locomotive being withdrawn in 1981.

Current status
EU20-24 has been preserved as an exhibit at the Warsaw Railway Museum, and is the only surviving example from the series.

Railway locomotives introduced in 1955
Co′Co′ locomotives
Polish State Railways electric locomotives
Standard gauge locomotives of Poland
LEW locomotives
Co′Co′ electric locomotives of Europe